Sri Lanka is a tropical island situated close to the southern tip of India. It is situated in the middle of Indian Ocean. Because of being an island, Sri Lanka has many endemic freshwater fauna, as well as thousands of marine and brackish water fauna. Fishing is the way of life of most of coastal community. So, the marine fish fauna gives a greater commercial value to the country's economy, as well as well being of the coastal people.

Marine fish are strictly different from freshwater counterparts due to high salinity of sea water, which they live. Also, they are larger than most freshwater species and rich in proteins.

There are about 100+ species of common commercial fish around the country. Crustaceans such as, crabs, lobsters, prawns, and squids, cuttlefish, and sea cucumbers also added to this list instead of fish types due to their high value commercially.

i.e. - All Sinhala words are typed by "SININETN" truetype font style of Singreesi software.

Cartilage fish
Class: Chondrichthyes

Mackerel sharks
Order: Lamniformes. Family: Lamnidae

Threshers
Family: Alopiidae

Requiem sharks
Family: Carcharhinidae

Hammerhead sharks
Family: Sphyrnidae

Guitarfish
Order: Rajiformes. Family: Rhinobatidae

Stingrays
Order: Myliobatiformes. Family: Dasyatidae

Rays
Family: Myliobatidae

Numbfish
Order: Torpediniformes. Family: Narcinidae

Bony fish
Class: Actinopterygii

Scombrid fish
Order: Perciformes. Family: Scombridae

Jacks and allies
Family: Carangidae

Sailfish and allies
Family: Istiophoridae

Swordfish
Family: Xiphiidae

Emperors
Family: Lethrinidae

Snappers
Family: Lutjanidae

Groupers
Family: Serranidae

Sweetlips
Family: Haemulidae

Threadfin bream
Family: Nemipteridae

Parrotfish
Family: Scaridae

Rabbitfish
Family: Siganidae

Barracudas
Family: Sphyraenidae

Mullets
Family: Mugilidae

Cutlassfish
Family: Trichiuridae

Mojarras
Family: Gerreidae

Ponyfish
Family: Leiognathidae

Herrings and allies
Order: Clupeiformes. Family: Clupeidae

Anchovy
Family: Engraulidae

Garfish
Order: Beloniformes. Family: Belonidae

Flying fish
Family: Exocoetidae

Halfbeaks
Family: Hemiramphidae

River garfish
Family: Zenarchopteridae

Crustaceans
Class: Malacostraca
Order: Decapoda

Family: Palaemonidae

Family: Penaeidae

Family: Palinuridae

Family: Scyllaridae

Order: Stomatopoda
Family: Odontodactylidae

Family: Portunidae

Molluscs
Class: Cephalopoda
Order: Teuthida

Family: Loliginidae

Order: Sepiida
Family: Sepiidae

Echinoderms
Class: Holothuroidea

Order: Holothuriida
Family: Holothuriidae

Order: Synallactida
Family: Stichopodidae

References

Fish of Asia
Commercial fish
Thunnus
Fish common names
Common commercial fish
common commercial fish